The Catholic University of Pelotas (UCPel) is a private and non-profit Catholic university, located in Pelotas, one of the more southern cities of the country. It is one of the largest and most prestigious Brazilian universities. It is maintained by the Catholic Archdiocese of Pelotas.

It also has campuses in five other municipalities: Arroio Grande, Canguçu, Pinheiro Machado, Piratini and Santa Vitória do Palmar.

References

Educational institutions established in 1960
Catholic universities and colleges in Brazil
1960 establishments in Brazil
Universities and colleges in Rio Grande do Sul